Ernobius angusticollis is a species of beetle in the family Ptinidae.

References

Further reading

 
 
 
 

Ptinidae
Beetles of Asia
Beetles of Europe
Beetles described in 1847
Taxa named by Julius Theodor Christian Ratzeburg